The Tees–Wear derby is a football local derby contested between Middlesbrough F.C. and Sunderland A.F.C. who are separated by 2 rivers and 30 miles, in the North East of England. Broadly, Sunderland fans based in the City of Sunderland and further north towards Tyneside focus most of their attention on Newcastle. Middlesbrough is not classed as a major rival in these areas primarily due to the increased distance from Teesside, and the lack of regular interaction with Teessiders. The rivalry of the Tees-Wear derby, however, is much more intense and evenly balanced in southern County Durham, where fans of both clubs live and work close together and interact regularly.

History
The rivalry intensified somewhat during the 1990s when the two teams spent much of their time at the top of Division 1, which resulted in clashes between sets of rival fans. Football related violence between the two sets of fans has reduced since Middlesbrough left Ayresome Park and Sunderland left Roker Park. This is in part due to the easier policing of matches at the new stadiums. However, heightened police presence is still required when the teams meet, as the fixture can lead to violent incidents between fans. Sunderland regularly reduce Middlesbrough's away allocations due to safety concerns and previous bad behaviour. 

Although Sunderland won trophies in the early 1900s it is Middlesbrough who have been more successful in recent times, reaching five major cup finals from 1997 to 2006, including the 2006 UEFA Cup Final and lifting the 2004 League Cup.

In the 2008–09 Premier League season, the results were:
Sunderland 2–0 Middlesbrough
Middlesbrough 1–1 Sunderland

In 2011–12 the teams played in the FA Cup:
Sunderland 1–1 Middlesbrough 28 January 2012
 Replay – Middlesbrough 1–2 Sunderland (AET) 8 February 2012. 

In 2012–13 the teams played in the Football League Cup
Sunderland 0–1 Middlesbrough 30 October 2012

In the 2016–17 Premier League season, the results were:
Sunderland 1–2 Middlesbrough
Middlesbrough 1–0 Sunderland

In the 2017–18 EFL Championship season, the results were:
Middlesbrough 1–0 Sunderland
Sunderland 3–3 Middlesbrough

In 2017–18 the teams played in the FA Cup
Middlesbrough 2–0 Sunderland 6 January 2018

In the 2022–23 EFL Championship season, the results were:
Middlesbrough 1–0 Sunderland

Summary of results
As of 5 September 2022

Honours

Table correct as of 5 September 2022

See also
Tyne–Tees derby
Tyne–Wear derby

References

England football derbies
Middlesbrough F.C.
Sunderland A.F.C.